The Financial Industry Regulatory Authority (FINRA) is a private American corporation that acts as a self-regulatory organization (SRO) that regulates member brokerage firms and exchange markets. FINRA is the successor to the National Association of Securities Dealers, Inc. (NASD) as well as the member regulation, enforcement, and arbitration operations of the New York Stock Exchange. The U.S. government agency that acts as the ultimate regulator of the U.S. securities industry, including FINRA, is the U.S. Securities and Exchange Commission (SEC).

Overview 

The Financial Industry Regulatory Authority is the largest independent regulator for all securities firms doing business in the United States. FINRA's mission is to protect investors by making sure the United States securities industry operates fairly and honestly. In December 2019, FINRA oversaw 3,517 brokerage firms, 153,907 branch offices and approximately 624,674 registered securities representatives.

FINRA has approximately 3,600 employees and operates from Washington, D.C., and New York City, with 20 regional offices around the United States.

FINRA offers regulatory oversight over all securities firms that do business with the public, plus those offering professional training, testing, and licensing of registered persons, arbitration and mediation, market regulation by contract for the New York Stock Exchange, the NASDAQ Stock Market, Inc., the American Stock Exchange LLC, and the International Securities Exchange, LLC; and industry utilities, such as Trade Reporting Facilities and other over-the-counter operations.

FINRA was formed by a consolidation of the member regulation, enforcement, and arbitration operations of the New York Stock Exchange, NYSE Regulation, Inc., and NASD. The merger was approved by the United States Securities and Exchange Commission (SEC) on July 26, 2007.

History 

The NASD was founded in 1939 and was registered with the SEC in response to the 1938 Maloney Act amendments to the Securities Exchange Act of 1934, which allowed it to supervise the conduct of its members subject to the oversight of the SEC. In 1971, NASD launched a new computerized stock trading system called the National Association of Securities Dealers Automated Quotations (NASDAQ) stock market. The NYSE and AMEX stock exchanges merged in 1998. Two years later, the NASDAQ underwent a major recapitalization and became an independent entity from NASD. In July 2007, the SEC approved the formation of a new SRO to be a successor to NASD. The NASD and the member regulation, enforcement and arbitration functions of the New York Stock Exchange were then consolidated into the Financial Industry Regulatory Authority (FINRA).

Board of governors 

The FINRA By-Laws provide that the FINRA Board must consist of the chief executive officer of FINRA, the chief executive officer of NYSE Regulation, eleven public governors, and ten industry governors, including a floor member governor, an independent dealer/insurance affiliate governor, an investment company affiliate governor, three small firm governors, one mid-size firm governor, and three large-firm governors. The small firm governors, mid-size firm governor, and large-firm governors are elected by members of FINRA according to their classification as a small firm, mid-size firm, or large firm.

Regulation and licensure functions 

FINRA regulates trading in equities, corporate bonds, securities futures, and options.  All firms dealing in securities that are not regulated by another SRO, such as by the Municipal Securities Rulemaking Board (MSRB), are required to be member firms of the FINRA.

As part of its regulatory authority, FINRA periodically conducts regulatory exams of its regulated institutions. FINRA recently released its tenth annual Regulatory and Examinations Priorities Letter for 2015, which impacts broker-dealers as well as their affiliated insurance companies and banks. In its Regulatory and Examinations Priorities Letter for 2015 FINRA has identified variable annuities as a significant area of focus for exams in 2015 and has pointed out particular elements of sales practices that will be reviewed.

FINRA licenses individuals and admits firms to the industry, writes rules to govern their behavior, examines them for regulatory compliance, and is sanctioned by the U.S. Securities and Exchange Commission (SEC) to discipline registered representatives and member firms that fail to comply with federal securities laws and FINRA's rules and regulations. It provides education and qualification examinations to industry professionals. It also sells outsourced regulatory products and services to a number of stock markets and exchanges; e.g. American Stock Exchange (AMEX) and the International Securities Exchange (ISE).

NASD, the predecessor of FINRA, founded the NASDAQ (National Association of Securities Dealers Automated Quotations) stock market in 1971. In 2006, NASD demutualized from NASDAQ by selling its ownership interest.

The NASD, later FINRA, publishes much educational information for the public and has been publishing and disclosing the education and exam requirements for USA based credentials, charters, designations and certifications that are offered by SROs for about a decade.

BrokerCheck disclosures

In 2017, Reuters published a report that showed a significant percentage of brokers with multiple disclosures on their record worked at 48 firms. FINRA could make this list of brokers with unusually high numbers of brokers with multiple disclosures searchable, but they refuse, arguing that hiring brokers with BrokerCheck disclosures is not illegal.

When a March 2020 study revealed that FINRA approves 84% of requests for expungement of BrokerCheck disclosures, Senator Elizabeth Warren addressed FINRA in a letter, stating, "...The study suggests that FINRA's current method of assessing expungement requests-which approves the vast majority of expungement requests-is failing to safeguard information needed for investor protection."

Central Registration Depository 

On behalf of state securities regulators, FINRA maintains the Central Registration Depository (CRD), the central database containing records for all firms and individuals registered in the securities industry of the United States.

Size and scale 

FINRA had total revenues of US$846.9 million in 2019. FINRA is funded primarily by assessments of member firms' registered representatives and applicants, annual fees paid by members, and by fines that it levies. The annual fee that each member pays includes a basic membership fee, an assessment based on gross income, a fee for each principal and registered representative, and charge for each branch office.

According to a study by Deborah G. Heilizer and Brian L. Rubin, partners at the Washington, D.C. law firm Sutherland Asbill & Brennan LLP, regulators with NASD and NYSE Regulation (later collectively known as FINRA) obtained supersized fines (i.e., fines over US$1 million) in 35 actions taken in 2005. In 2006, however, that number dropped to 19; furthermore, the number of enforcement actions over US$5 million also fell. In 2005, there were seven such actions as opposed to three in 2006. According to the written report, the "data suggest that securities regulators may have retrenched their efforts to regulate through the use of novel theories."

FINRA collected fines against financial firms totaling US$25.9 million in 2008, a third straight annual decline in fines levied by FINRA or one of its predecessor agencies. The 2008 total was 82% below the US$148.5 million in fines collected in 2005. According to FINRA, the fines levied in 2009 were US$47.6 million, declining slightly to US$42.2 million in 2010 and then expanding to US$71.9 million for 2011.

Arbitration 

FINRA operates the largest arbitration forum in the United States for the resolution of disputes between customers and member firms, as well as between brokerage firm employees and their firms. This function had been performed by both NASD and NYSE's regulation committee until their merger in 2007 to form FINRA. Each entity had its own set of rules on arbitration procedures. After its creation, FINRA Dispute Resolution harmonized the prior NYSE and NASD rules.) Virtually all agreements between investors and their stockbrokers include mandatory arbitration agreements, whereby investors (and the brokerage firms) waive their right to trial in a court of law. While arbitration cases are the usual resolution procedure of last resort, class action cases are brought and often permitted to go forward in courts as well, where binding arbitration contracts are sometimes rejected, typically after being ruled unconscionable; see Wilko v. Swan. Although the fairness of such mandatory arbitration clauses has been called into question, U.S. federal courts have often found them to be lawful and have generally upheld both the enforceability and result of these arbitrations, except in the case of class actions.

As of May 2011, the pool of arbitrators consisted of 2,854 individuals classified by FINRA as industry panelists and 3,557 individuals classified as non-industry panelists.

In 1987, the United States Supreme Court ruled in Shearson/American Express Inc. v. McMahon that clauses mandating arbitration for disputes under the Securities Exchange Act of 1934 were enforceable. Three years later, it overturned Wilko completely in Rodriguez de Quijas v. Shearson/American Express Inc., extending the arbitration requirement to disputes under the Securities Act of 1933. Thus, many securities disputes are now resolved in arbitration.

For disputes over US$100,000 between customers and member firms, the panel that decides the case generally consists of three arbitrators: one industry (or, at the customer's timely discretion non-industry) panelist, one non-industry panelist, and one non-industry chairperson, according to the Code of Arbitration Procedure for Customer Disputes. For disputes between an employee and member firms, all three arbitrators are industry panelists, according to the industry code. For a given case, the two sides are provided separate lists by FINRA of ten local arbitrators for each category from which each party can strike up to four arbitrators and provide a ranking for the rest. Also provided are ten-year biographies and prior award histories for each arbitrator. FINRA will then provide the parties with the panel members by selecting the highest ranked available arbitrator from each category.

According to FINRA, there were 5,680 cases for arbitration filed in 2010, a decrease from the 7,137 cases filed in 2009. The percentage of cases in which customers are awarded damages has risen slightly from 42% in 2008 to 47–48% in 2010 and 2011. FINRA rates any positive award to a customer as a win for the customer, regardless of the magnitude of losses or legal fees.

FINRA rules do not require parties to be represented by attorneys. A party may also appear pro se, or be represented by a non-attorney in arbitration. The third option is not advised, however, since this may be the unauthorized practice of law. Brokerage firms routinely hire attorneys, so a customer who does not can be at a serious disadvantage. One organization whose members specialize in representing customers against brokerage firms in FINRA arbitrations is the Public Investors Arbitration Bar Association (PIABA).

In June 2006, Lewis D. Lowenfels, one of two partners at the New York law firm of Tolins & Lowenfels and co-author of the looseleaf treatise Bromberg and Lowenfels on Securities Fraud and Commodities Fraud, 2d said of the NASD arbitration process: "What started out as a relatively swift and economical process for a public customer claimant to seek justice has evolved into a costly extended adversarial proceeding dominated by trial lawyers and the usual litigation tactics."

Perhaps amidst speculation that the U.S. Congress was contemplating passing legislation preventing mandatory arbitration clauses, FINRA announced in July 2008 that it would be launching a pilot program to evaluate all-public arbitration panels (thus not requiring an industry arbitrator to be on each panel). In February 2011, FINRA announced that it would be making the program permanent. In that announcement, Richard Ketchum, FINRA Chairman and Chief Executive Officer stated "We believe that giving investors the ability to have an all-public panel will increase public confidence in the fairness of our dispute resolution process." There are those, however, who see valid reasons for including an industry arbitrator on each panel. According to Richard Jackson, a principal at the advisor firm of Schlindwein Associates, LLC "It's probably pretty important to have someone on the panel who has specific industry knowledge and past experience in that field to explain some of the complexities that may be at issue,"

FINRA does have a broker check system.  This system lists the registered and licensed professionals.  Those who have had complaints will also remain in the online system.  Others who have passed exams, but have let their licenses retire, are not listed in the system if they had a clean record on their FINRA Form U5.

See also 

 Securities market participants in the United States
 Securities Investor Protection Corporation (SIPC)
 Municipal Securities Rulemaking Board (MSRB)
 American Academy of Financial Management
 Alternative display facility
 ACT (Automated Confirmation of Transactions)
 Securities regulation in the United States
 List of finance topics
 List of Securities Examinations

References

External links 

 
 
 U.S. Securities and Exchange Commission (SEC)
 

1939 establishments in the United States
Arbitration organizations
Financial regulatory authorities of the United States
Organizations established in 1939
Self-regulatory organizations in the United States
Trade associations based in the United States
United States securities law